Lectionary 312 (Gregory-Aland), designated by siglum ℓ 312 (in the Gregory-Aland numbering) is a Greek manuscript of the New Testament, on parchment. Palaeographically it has been assigned to the 9th century. The manuscript has survived in a fragmentary condition.

Description 
The original codex contained lessons from the Gospels (Evangelistarium), on 2 fragment parchment leaves, with some lacunae.
It contains the text of Matthew 20:8-15; Luke 1:14-20.

The text is written in Greek uncial letters.

History 
Gregory dated the manuscript to the 9th century. It is presently assigned by the INTF to the 9th century.

The manuscript was added to the list of New Testament manuscripts by Caspar René Gregory (number 312e). Constantin von Tischendorf saw it in 1844.

Currently the codex is housed at the Saint Catherine's Monastery in the Sinai.

The fragment is not cited in critical editions of the Greek New Testament (UBS4, NA27).

See also 

 List of New Testament lectionaries
 Biblical manuscript
 Textual criticism
 Lectionary 311

Notes and references

Bibliography 
 

Greek New Testament lectionaries
9th-century biblical manuscripts